Crematogaster binghamii is a species of ant in tribe Crematogastrini. It was described by Forel in 1904.

References

binghamii
Insects described in 1904